Myanmar is scheduled to compete at the 2019 Southeast Asian Games in the Philippines from 30 November to 11 December 2019. Athletes from Myanmar compete in 31 out 56 sports.

Medal summary

Medal by sport

Medal by date

Medalists

Arnis 
The athletes of Myanmar Thaing Federation prepared to compete in Arnis events of 30th SEA Games. The athletes left Yangon on 23 November with 23 officials and athletes. The team is led by the general secretary of the federation, Khin Lay Mon. The team is composed with 5 officials, 10 male athletes and 8 female athletes.

On 1.12.2019, the Arnis team took the first medal for Myanmar with 2 silver medals and 7 bronze medals.
 After the all events, the Arnis team took the most medals for Myanmat with 1 gold medal, 4 silver medals and 15 bronze medals.

References

Southeast Asian Games
2019
Nations at the 2019 Southeast Asian Games